Doran Park can refer to two places in the United States:
Doran Park, a Cape Cod Baseball League park in Bourne, Massachusetts
Doran Regional Park, a park in Bodega Bay, California